Gun laws in Norway incorporates the political and regulatory aspects of firearms usage in the country. Citizens are allowed to keep firearms (most commonly for hunting, sports shooting). The acquisition and storage of guns is regulated by the state.

Regulations 
Firearms in Norway are regulated by the Firearm Weapons Act, with a new secondary law in effect 1 July 2009 providing more detailed regulation. The act covers all firearms, air pressure weapons, and some "exotic arms" as the act defines. All weapons that would be regulated must have two things in common: they must eject a projectile mechanically and use some form of propellant to perform the ejection. The act includes military type weapons, flare guns and replicas that can "easily" be converted to working firearms. Guns owned and operated under the responsibility of the armed forces and the police are exempt from the civilian weapons act.

The detailed interpretation of the law is laid out in another regulation.

Suppressors are not regulated under Norwegian law, and may be purchased by anyone. Suppressors are also legal while hunting, and seen as a necessity for more comfortable shooting and to lower the environmental impact of noise.

Types of civilian-owned guns 
Norway has a large population of hunters. Semi-automatic and bolt-action rifles, as well as shotguns, make up the better part of the guns in civilian homes. There is a total ban on automatic firearms for civilians, unless they fall into the collector category. Modification of semi-automatic guns into fully automatic without the consent of the police is a felony crime.

Handguns have some calibre restrictions. A Smith & Wesson Model 500, for example, is illegal due to its high power, but other, less powerful guns, are legal as they are used in sports shooting. Norway has a long tradition of high-end sports shooting competitions, especially rifle shooting. Each calibre must be used in some type of competition to be allowed. Also, there is a restriction on the number of weapons an owner can have for each calibre. For recreational shooters, only one gun is allowed in each calibre. For professional and semi-professional shooters, a spare gun is allowed. A recreational shooter is only allowed to own four different handguns. To obtain more, documentation on extensive involvement in sport shooting is needed.

Ownership 

Gun ownership is restricted in Norway, unless one has officially documented a use for the gun. By far the most common grounds for civilian ownership are hunting and sports shooting, in that order. Other needs can include special guard duties or self-defense, but the first is rare unless the person shows identification confirming that they are a trained guard or member of a law-enforcement agency.

There are special rules for collectors of guns. They are exempt from many parts of the regulation, but, in turn, they must meet even narrower qualifications. Collectors may purchase, but not fire without permission, all kinds of guns in their respective areas of interest, which they have defined in advance.

Ownership is regulated in paragraph 7, and responsibility for issuing a gun ownership license is given to the police authority in the applicant's district.

Rifle and shotgun ownership permission can be given to "sober and responsible" persons 18 years or older. The applicant for the permission must document a need for the weapon. Three exceptions exist to this age qualification. Persons under the age of 18, but over 16 may apply for rifle or shotgun ownership licence with the consent of parents or guardian. For handguns, the ownership age is 21, but a license can be issued to those 18 or older if certain criteria are met. However, such license is valid for only 1 year and must be renewed to avoid revocation. For inherited weapons, it is up to the local police chief to make a decision based on the individual facts of the case.

Obtaining a license 

There are two ways of obtaining an ownership license in Norway. The most common is through the process of obtaining a hunting license, the other is through a sports shooting license.

For hunting 

To obtain a hunting license, the applicant must complete a 30-hour, 9-session course and pass a written multiple choice exam. The course includes firearm theory, firearm training, wildlife theory, and environmental protection training.

Once the exam is passed, the applicant may enroll in the hunter registry and receive a hunting license. The membership must be renewed each year, through license payment. The hunting license is brought to the police station, where the applicant fills out an application for obtaining the proper firearm for his or her hunt. After evaluation, part of the application is sent back to the applicant if it was approved. Upon approval, the applicant can take the returned form to the store and purchase the firearm listed in the application.

For sports shooters 
The qualification process for sporting is theoretically easier, but requires more time and practice. The applicant must enroll in a firearm safety course, lasting at least 9 hours. The course includes a written test, but is shorter than the hunting exam, as it only deals with firearm safety. Two-thirds of the course are completed on the shooting range as practice. The passing of the test results in acceptance to the approved gun club, and a license for competition. However, while the hunters can obtain their firearm almost at once, sports shooters must prove their intentions to compete by actively training or competing in the gun club. This means regular attendance (at least 15 times) at gun club training over the course of six months. The applicant must use firearms owned by the club or borrowed at the range for this period. After six months, the applicant may apply for weapon ownership. The start license and a written recommendation from the gun club president are brought to the police station, and the competition class is filled out on the application. If approved, it will be returned to the applicant as with the hunter license.

In both cases, if the application is rejected, the applicant is allowed an explanation of the reason, and an appeal.

For competition shooters in DFS 
For competitive shooters in Det frivillige Skyttervesen (DFS) you will need an active membership for 6 months, and limitations for membership is Norwegian Nationals only. There is training course for youth from age 8 and up to 18, for adults an introduction to safety and behavior on the range is given, no written exams are required. Active members can apply for rifles approved by DFS competitions such as Sauer 200 STR in caliber 6.5×55 Scan, 308 Win, and 22lr only, Other approved rifles is Krag–Jørgensen, Mauser M98, and other competition bolt-action rifles in 22lr with trigger pull of 1.5 kg

Guns in civilian ownership 
The laws for storage of firearms are strict.

For shotguns and rifles, the requirement given in the weapons act is to have the firearm, or a vital part of it, securely locked away. Generally, this means an approved gun safe, securely bolted to a non-removable part of the house. (A vital part is considered to be the bolt group—the bolt head will suffice—for rifles, the slide for pistols, or the barrel of a shotgun.)

The police are allowed to make a home inspection of the safe. An inspection must be announced more than 48 hours in advance, and the police are only allowed to see the safe and make sure it is legally installed.

Ammunition is generally only sold to persons with valid weapon license. However, if one is in possession of a legally unregistered shotgun bought before 1 April 1990, and is in the hunter registry, one can purchase shotgun ammunition by showing a firearms license or a hunting permit at the place of purchase. Without a special permit only 10,000 rounds of ammunition can be stored by a single person, or 15,000 rounds if 5,000 of them are .22 LR or smaller calibre. 

Older rules stated that the ammunition must be locked away separately, but these rules were abandoned in the latest revision of the weapons act.

Transportation 

The owner must always have a good reason to bring the weapon to a public place. Such reasons include transportation to a range or hunting area, transportation for repairs, or for maintenance and hobby activities.

During transportation, the weapon must be empty and concealed, but not worn on the body, and under the constant supervision of the owner. This applies equally to replicas, air guns and decommissioned firearms.

Homeloading 
Homeloading is legal in Norway if you have a weapon license. You can only load for calibres you have a weapon license on or a “loan permit”. You can have up to 5kg of smokeless powder in your house and a maximum of 10,000 primers.

You can also have 3kg of black powder outside of your house in maximum 1kg boxes, hence you can have three 1kg boxes. They needed to be stored in the original plastic container and stored in a wooden box with walls separating the containers. It can’t also be stored in a room with open heat source like a fireplace or oven

Firearm ownership 
As of 2017 there are 1,329,000 (or 25 per 100 people) registered firearms owned by 486,028 (or 36% of population) people in Norway.

References

External links
 ACT NO. 1 OF 9 JUNE 1961 RELATING TO FIREARMS AND AMMUNITION
 Lov om skytevåpen og ammunisjon m.v. [våpenloven]

Norway
Law
Law of Norway